

Events
 550s – Procopius writes The Buildings of Justinian ( Perì Ktismáton, "On Buildings").

Buildings and structures

Buildings

 About 500 – Arian Baptistry and Archbishop's Chapel, Ravenna completed.
 504 – Basilica of Sant'Apollinare Nuovo, Ravenna dedicated to Christ the Redeemer (completed about 520).
 520 – St. Nicholas Church, Demre, Anatolia, built.
 520s – Mausoleum of Theodoric, Ravenna completed.
 523 – Songyue Pagoda of China completed.
 527 to 536 – Construction of the Church of Saints Sergios and Bacchos in Constantinople.
 527 to 548 – Construction of the Basilica of San Vitale, Ravenna, begun under the Ostrogoths and finished by the Byzantines.
 532 to 537 – Hagia Sophia in Constantinople built by Isidore of Miletus and Anthemius of Tralles.
 After 540 – Construction of Taq-i Kisra (iwan) at Ctesiphon in the Sasanian Empire begins.
 549 – Basilica of Sant'Apollinare in Classe near Ravenna consecrated.
 550 – Rebuilt Church of the Holy Apostles in Constantinople, built by Anthemius of Tralles and Isidore of Miletus, dedicated.
 About 560 – First Nantes Cathedral constructed.
 569 – Hwangnyongsa temple completed in Gyeongju, Silla.
 About 570 – Basilica of St. Sernin, Toulouse constructed.
 582 – Daxing (大兴城) founded in China by Emperor Wen of Sui.
 593 – Gangō-ji (元興寺) temple first built in Asuka, Japan (later moved to Nara).

See also
5th century in architecture
7th century in architecture
Timeline of architecture

References 

Architecture